Suiyuan was a historical province of China. Suiyuan's capital was Guisui (now Hohhot). The area Suiyuan covered is approximated today by the prefecture-level cities of Hohhot, Baotou, Wuhai, Ordos, Bayan Nur, and parts of Ulanqab, all today part of Inner Mongolia Autonomous Region. Suiyuan was named after a district in the capital established in the Qing Dynasty.

Most of the work and settlement of Suiyuan at this time was done by Shanxi farmer-soldiers under the direction of retired officers from Yan's army. Yan's control of Suiyuan was sufficient to cause one visiting reporter to refer to Suiyuan as a "colony" of Shanxi.

The Suiyuan campaign took place in Suiyuan during the Second Sino-Japanese War. It became a part of the puppet state of Mengjiang from 1937 to 1945 under Japanese rule.

During the Chinese Civil War in 1935, Communist leader Mao Zedong promised Mongol leaders a "unified autonomous" administration which would include all "historic" Mongol lands within China, in exchange for Mongol support against the Kuomintang. This promise included the declaration that, "Under no circumstances should other [non-Mongol ethnic groups] be allowed to occupy the land of the Inner Mongolian nation". However, following the communist victory in 1949, the administrators of the soon-to-be "Mongolian" territories with Han Chinese majorities, the biggest of which was Suiyuan with a population of over 2 million, resisted annexation by the new Inner Mongolia Autonomous Region. In 1954, Mao reached a compromise with Suiyuan, which involved the Mongols' taking over the administration of Suiyuan, but stipulated that the Han natives not be expelled from the territory. Uradyn Bulag thus notes that "ironically", the Mongols' territorial ambitions against Suiyuan resulted in their becoming a "small minority within their own [enlarged] autonomous region".

In popular culture 
 W. Douglas Burden references Suiyuan in his book Look to the Wilderness, in the chapter "On the Sino-Mongolian Frontier".

See also

References 

Provinces of the Republic of China (1912–1949)
Former provinces of China
Geography of Inner Mongolia
History of Inner Mongolia
1954 disestablishments in China